Graig Wood is a Site of Special Scientific Interest (SSSI), noted for its biological characteristics, in Monmouthshire, south east Wales. It forms part of the wider Hael Woods complex.

Geography

The wood is jointly owned and managed by Gwent Wildlife Trust and the Forestry Commission.

Wildlife and ecology
As with other woodland in the Wye Valley Area of Outstanding Natural Beauty, Graig Wood contains many local and rare tree species. The predominant species within the wood are ash (Fraxinus excelsior) and wych elm (Ulmus glabra), although other species present include black alder (Alnus glutinosa), common beech (Fagus sylvatica) and small-leaved lime (Tilia cordata).

The stream banks and old buildings within the wood are home to rich bryophyte colonies. Hart's-tongue fern (Asplenium scolopendrium) and snowdrops (Galanthus) also grow on the site.

Dormice have been reported within the woodland.

References

Forests and woodlands of Monmouthshire
Nature reserves in Monmouthshire
Sites of Special Scientific Interest in Monmouthshire
Sites of Special Scientific Interest notified in 1981